Ddakji, or ttakji, is a Korean game played by two or more players. Ddakji is constructed by folding two square pieces of paper together into a square. As with milk caps, the game is won by flipping the other player's card.

In popular culture
The South Korean variety show Running Man occasionally features ddakji in its missions. The game is also featured in the first episode of the Netflix television series Squid Game.

References 

Korean games
Children's games
Street games